Shavar Malik Ross (born March 4, 1971), is an American actor, film director, screenwriter, film producer, editor, photographer, author, online retail entrepreneur, and spiritual mentor and teacher. He is known for his recurring television role as Dudley Johnson, Gary Coleman's best friend in the NBC sitcom Diff'rent Strokes, Alex "Weasel" Parks in the ABC sitcom Family Matters, and as "Reggie the Reckless" in the fifth installment of the Friday the 13th movie series Friday the 13th: A New Beginning (1985).

Biography
Ross was born in New York City in the South Bronx. His parents separated when he was seven years old. His mother took Shavar and his sister to Macon, Georgia, while his father went to Los Angeles to pursue an acting career.

In 1979, while visiting his father in California during his school's Christmas vacation, Shavar was discovered by top children's agent Evelyn Shultz. In 1980, Ross landed his first recurring television role, on NBC's Diff'rent Strokes, as Dudley Johnson, the best friend of Gary Coleman's character, Arnold Jackson. Also in 1980, Shavar appeared in the TV film Scout's Honor, also with Gary Coleman. Two years later, Ross became a voice actor for Hanna-Barbera and voiced Our Gang kid Billie "Buckwheat" Thomas from the animated TV series version of The Little Rascals. He also appeared in season 2 of the television show Benson, episode 11 "Big Buddy" and episode 17 "Easy Kid Stuff".  Ross also had a recurring role on the series Family Matters as "Weasel". Ross has appeared in over 100 film and episodic television projects throughout his career, including such films as the fifth installment of the Friday the 13th movie series Friday the 13th: A New Beginning in 1985 as "Reggie A.K.A. Reggie the Reckless" and as Bryant Calvin, T.C.'s (Roger E. Mosley) son (from 1986 to 1988) in the television series Magnum, P.I.

Additionally, in 1996, after completing four years of Bible School at The Ministry Training Institute, an auxiliary of Crenshaw Christian Center, Ross founded The Alive Church, a non-denominational Christian church in Los Angeles, and was its pastor for four years.

Shavar is founder and CEO of Tri-Seven Entertainment, Inc., a film, television and online retail company which produces, develops, acquires and distributes inspirational products for a global audience.  As a director, his first short film, Soul to Take (2003), garnered him an Internet distribution deal with Russell Simmons' media company Simmons/Lathan Media Group.  His second short film, A Taste of Us (2004), dealt with the civil unrest of the 1960s segregation in the south and was originally made as a pilot presentation for the TV One Network.   Lord Help Us (released nationally in May 2007), an inspirational urban romantic comedy starring American Idol‘s Nadia Turner, Oscar nominee Margaret Avery (The Color Purple), Debra Wilson (MADtv, Scary Movie 4), comedian Joe Clair (BET's Rap City, Take the Cake), Grammy-Award winning singer Al Jarreau and many others marked his feature film directorial debut.

In May 2006, Ross appeared on an E! Child Stars Special, Geeks, Freaks, and Sidekicks, where he revealed that during the taping of the very special episode of Diff'rent Strokes in which he was molested, he was going through a similar experience in real life; he was being "touched" by a family friend inappropriately while he was asleep.

In 2008, he played a "prosperity preacher" on David Alan Grier's show Chocolate News on Comedy Central.

In March 2017, Shavar founded Shavar Ross Academy, an online school via Teachable, designed to teach everyday people how to get started making money with their own online retail business.

References

External links

ShavarRossAcademy.com

Living people
African-American Christians
African-American male actors
American male child actors
American male film actors
American male television actors
American male voice actors
Male actors from New York City
21st-century African-American people
20th-century African-American people
1971 births